The 2021 B&L Transport 170 was a NASCAR Xfinity Series race held on June 5, 2021. It was contested over 78 laps—extended from 75 laps due to an overtime finish—on the  road course. It was the thirteenth race of the 2021 NASCAR Xfinity Series season. Kaulig Racing driver A. J. Allmendinger collected his second win of the season.

Report

Background
The track opened as a 15-turn, 2.4-mile (3.86 km) road circuit run clockwise. The back portion of the track allows speeds approaching 180 mph (290 km/h). A separate starting line is located on the backstretch to allow for safer rolling starts. The regular start/finish line is located on the pit straight.

Entry list 

 (R) denotes rookie driver.
 (i) denotes driver who is ineligible for series driver points.

Qualifying
Austin Cindric was awarded the pole for the race as determined by competition-based formula. Dillon Bassett and Timmy Hill did not have enough points to qualify for the race.

Starting Lineups

Race

Race results

Stage Results 
Stage One
Laps: 25

Stage Two
Laps: 45

Final Stage Results 

Laps: 25

Race statistics 

 Lead changes: 7 among 5 different drivers
 Cautions/Laps: 7 for 23
 Time of race: 2 hours, 39 minutes, and 36 seconds
 Average speed:

References 

2021 in sports in Ohio
BandL Transport 170
2021 NASCAR Xfinity Series
NASCAR races at Mid-Ohio Sports Car Course